Wang Na (born 25 February 1990 in Shandong) is a female Chinese volleyball player who win the 2014 FIVB World Championship silver medal.

Clubs
  Zhejiang New Century Tourism (2009–2018)
  Supreme Chonburi (2019)
  Zhejiang Jiaxing Xitang Ancient Town (2020–present)

Awards

Individual

Club
 2018–19 Thailand League -  Runner-Up, with Supreme Chonburi
 2019 Thai–Denmark Super League -  Champion, with Supreme Chonburi
 2019 Asian Club Championship -  Runner-Up, with Supreme Chonburi

National team

Senior team 
 2014 World Championship -  Silver medal

References

1990 births
Living people
Chinese women's volleyball players
Volleyball players from Zhejiang
Setters (volleyball)
21st-century Chinese women